Stay Sick! is the fourth studio album (and ninth overall) by the American rock band the Cramps. It was released on February 12, 1990, by Enigma Records, recorded at Music Grinder in Hollywood, self-produced by guitarist Poison Ivy and engineered by Steve McMillan. It was the last made in studio with founding drummer Nick Knox.

"Bikini Girls with Machine Guns" was the band's only UK Top 40 single, reaching No. 35 in 1990.

The Cramps reissued the album on their own Vengeance Records in 2001. This edition contained four bonus tracks: "Bikini Girls with Machine Guns (Live)", "Beat Out My Love," "Jailhouse Rock" and "Jackyard Backoff". It also featured a slightly different cover.

Track listing

Personnel
The Cramps
Lux Interior - vocals
Poison Ivy Rorschach - guitar
Candy Del Mar - bass guitar
Nick Knox - drums
Technical
Steve Macmillan - engineer
Lux Interior - front cover photography

Notes and references

1990 albums
The Cramps albums